The 2016–17 UC Riverside Highlanders men's basketball team represented the University of California, Riverside during the 2016–17 NCAA Division I men's basketball season. The Highlanders were led by fourth year head coach Dennis Cutts and played their home games at the Student Recreation Center Arena as members of the Big West Conference. They finished the season 7–21, 5–11 in Big West play to finish in eighth place. They lost in the quarterfinals of the Big West tournament to UC Irvine.

Previous season
The Highlanders the season 14–19, 5–11 in Big West play to finish in a tie for sixth place. They lost in the first round of the Big West tournament to Long Beach State.

Departures

Incoming transfers

2016 incoming recruits

Roster

Schedule and results

|-
!colspan=9 style=| Non-conference regular season

|-
!colspan=9 style=| Big West Conference regular season

|-
!colspan=9 style=| Big West tournament

References

UC Riverside Highlanders men's basketball seasons
UC Riverside